UDN can stand for:
National Democratic Union (Brazil) (União Democrática Nacional),a political party that existed in Brazil between 1945 and 1965
Univision Deportes Network, a Spanish-language sports channel in the United States
Ulcerative dermal necrosis, a disease of salmon and trout
United Daily News, a Taiwanese newspaper
IATA airport code for Codroipo civil airport in Italy
Unique Device Name of the UPnP Device Architecture
Undiagnosed Diseases Network, an NIH-funded study of intractable medical conditions that have eluded diagnosis
University of Da Nang